The Sikkim Premier League is the state-level franchise football league in Sikkim, India. The first season under new league name was started in 2023, organised by the Football Development Private Limited and the Sikkim Football Association.

League names

Sikkim Premier Division League
It was the highest level football league in Sikkim, organised by the Sikkim Football Association. It started with 8 teams in 2011. United Sikkim FC is the only team to have won two consecutive and three league titles in total. The league was suspended in 2019, following dispute between the Football Players Association of Sikkim (FCAS) and the SFA.

Sikkim Premier League
In order to revive competitive football in the state, a new franchise league was developed by the former regional footballers under the banner of Football Development Private Limited (FDPL). The league is sponsored by Teesta Urja Limited and the Government of Sikkim. The league includes teams from different districts of Sikkim in order to provide a pan-state and more competitive structure.

Current teams

Winners

References

Sikkim Premier Division League
Football leagues in India
2011 establishments in Sikkim
Football in Sikkim